Thymus capitellatus is a species of flowering plant in the mint family Lamiaceae, endemic to Portugal.

Description
It has long, graceful stems, quadrangular in section, with very short hairs. Purple stamens. n = 15.

Distribution and habitat
Thymus capitellatus is native to southwest Portugal and is strongly present around the Tagus Estuary and Sado Estuary, inhabiting moorlands, xerophilic scrub (cistus, heaths) and sometimes in pine, eucalyptus and acacia forests, colonizing sandy acid soils of a dune nature and above all paleodunes (stabilized dunes).

References

capitellatus
Endemic flora of Portugal
Endemic flora of the Iberian Peninsula